Bouman is a Dutch surname. Notable people with the surname include:

Casper Bouman (born 1985), Dutch sailor
Charles Bouman, American engineer
Hendrik Bouman (born 1951), Dutch harpsichordist
Jan Bouman (1706–1776), Dutch architect
Katie Bouman (born 1989), American computer scientist
Kea Bouman (1903–1998), Dutch tennis player
Piet Bouman (1892–1980), Dutch footballer
Tara Bouman (born 1970), Dutch musician
Todd Bouman (born 1972), American football quarterback

See also
Bouwman

Dutch-language surnames